The South West Region, officially the South West Ethiopia Peoples' Region is a regional state in southwestern Ethiopia. It was split off from the Southern Nations, Nationalities, and Peoples' Region (SNNPR) on 23 November 2021 after a successful referendum.

It consists of the Keffa, Sheka, Bench Sheko, Dawro, West Omo Zones, and Konta special woreda. The working language of the region is Amharic.

Chief administrator

Negash Wagesho (chief administrator) 2021–present

Party leader

Tsegaye Mamo (Party leader) 2021–present

Administrative zones
The following table shows administrative zones and special woredas, (an administrative subdivision which is similar to an autonomous area), is based on information from the 2007 census; the list of second administrative level bodies maintained by the United Nations Geographic Information Working Group dates from 2002,

References

Regions of Ethiopia
States and territories established in 2021
South West Ethiopia Peoples' Region